Tarawera Ultramarathon is a trail running event which includes a 21km, 50km, 102km and a 100-mile ultramarathon trail race, with the inaugural even held in 2009, it is part of the Ultra-Trail World Tour. It is held annually in February and takes place in Rotorua, New Zealand.  Awards are given to top men and women finishers in each category.

The race was created by Paul Charteris.

Event history 
The inaugural race was over an 85km distance and was won by New Zealanders, Kerry Suter and Jean Beaumont.  Kerry backed up his 2009 win with a further win in 2010, this time over a new distance, 100km.  In 2017 the 100km race was extended by 2km to a complete distance of 102km.  In 2018 the inaugural 100 mile race was added to the event and was won by Frenchman Adrian Prigent and American Sally McRae.

The 2023 edition is hosted as part of the UTMB World Series.

Course records 
The course record in the 100-mile race is held by the Australian Vladimir Shatrov and was set in the 2020 edition in a time of 15h 53m 30s among a field of more than 1,450 entrants.

Results and past winners 
Past 100km race winners include American Jim Walmsley, who described the course as “extremely hot, but beautiful” upon finishing the 2017 edition which was held in February of that year; seasonal rivers, chirping cicadas, and green tree canopy decorated the course.

References

Notes 

Athletics competitions in New Zealand
Sport in Rotorua
Ultramarathons
Ultra-Trail World Tour